Helen Wong Smith is an American archivist and librarian. She is the archivist and librarian for University Records at the University of Hawai‘i at Mānoa. She works in the University Archives and Manuscripts Collection of the Public Services Division. She is formerly an Archivist and Librarian for the State Historic Preservation Division as well as the Executive Director of the Kauaʻi Historical Society. Smith is an active member of the Society of American Archivists, becoming President Elect in 2022, and having served in many leadership roles including on the Council, the Committee on Education, and the Nominating Committee from 2012-2014. Smith was named an SAA Fellow on June 10, 2016.

Early life and education 
Smith's hometown is Heʻeia on the island of Oʻahu. Her heritage is Chinese and Portuguese.

She attended the University of Hawai‘i for a Bachelor's Degree in Hawaiian Studies as well as her Master's in Library Science.

Career 
Smith has worked in several archive or library positions across Hawai‘i, including the Hawaiian Collection Librarian at the University of Hawaiʻi at Hilo and lead archivist for the Pacific Island Network of the National Park Service. In 2000, she became a Certified Archivist and served on their Nominating Committee. She has been elected twice as the president of the Association of Hawai‘i Archivists, as well as serving as president of the Hawaiian Library Association and the Hawaiian Historical Society.

She has served as ambassador of Hawaiian and Pacific archives and worked to bring forward unknown or forgotten collections in her research and presentations. She has researched and written on Hawaiian cultural resources as well as presenting her discoveries through lectures and workshops for over 35 years.

Smith is also a strong advocate for cultural competency among archivists and allied professions. In 2015, she addressed the SAA at their Annual Meeting with her "Adopting Cultural Diversity Competence" presentation, which is now a workshop that is offered by the SAA. In the description of the course, Smith explains Cultural Diversity Competency (CDC) is "the ability to function with awareness, knowledge, and interpersonal skill when engaging people of different backgrounds, assumptions, beliefs, values, and behaviors." Among the desired outcomes, the course should bring students to critically examine their interactions with people of other cultures, create methods to improve those interactions, and "combine cultural-mindedness with culturally centered communication skills for effective relationships with all people forming the basis for culturally competent organizations, communities and societies."

In an interview with Joyce Gabiola, Smith explained that she was surprised to be nominated for the SAA Fellows Award. When she first joined the SAA, she felt very isolated. Not un-welcomed, but definitely not embraced. When seeing who was on Council and the leadership, I believed the only place would be AACR. There wasn't a clear opportunity for me back then, so I was shocked when I became a Fellow. I haven't written books, so being elected is an example of inclusion and diversity. From the middle of the Pacific my contribution has been limited and it's most likely the introduction and training in cultural competency that has led SAA to recognize me.Smith has advocated for diversity among archivists and archives. In the same interview, she states that "our job as archivists is to show what we have, but also what isn’t there—what this collection lacks. This is why it’s important for professionalization."

Publications 
 “Expanding the Reach of the Cosmic Dancer: Inter-campus Collaboration Provides Access to the works of the Rev. Dr. Mitsuo Aoki”  Archival Outlook, Society of American Archivists, July/August 2022.
 Relevant, Respectful, and Responsive: Government Archives in the 21st Century – An Overview of Cultural Competency in State and Territorial Archives in 2022, Michelle Gallinger, Helen Wong Smith, Anne W. Ackerson, State Electronic Records Initiative, Council of State Archivists, March 2022. 
 “Review of Leading and Managing Archives and Manuscripts Programs,” American Archivist, 83-1 (Spring/Summer 2020). 
 "Introduction," Diversity, Inclusion, and Cultural Competency Special Issue, Journal of Western Archives: 2019 Vol. 10: Iss. 1, Article 1. 
  “Assessing Power Dynamics in Multigenerational Archives” Archival Outlook, Society of American Archivists, January/February 2021. 
  “Transition from Traditional to Western Medicine in Hawai‘i (Part 2) Western Legislative Impacts on Traditional Medical Practices” Hawai‘i Journal of Medicine & Public Health, May 2016, Vol 75, No 5
  “Transition from Traditional to Western Medicine in Hawai‘i (Part 1)” Hawai`i Journal of Medicine & Public Health, March 2016, Vol 75, No 3.
  Significance of HbA1c and its measurement in the diagnosis of diabetes mellitus: US experience, Juarez DT, Demaris KM, Goo R, Mnatzaganian CL, Wong Smith H, Diabetes, Metabolic Syndrome and Obesity: Targets and Therapy October 2014 Volume 2014:7 Pages 487-494.
 “Transition from Tradition to Western Medicine in Hawai‘i (Part 2): Western Legislative Impacts on Traditional Medicine Practices.” Hawai‘i Journal of Medicine & Public Health 75, no. 5 (2016): 148-150.
 “Transition from Traditional to Western Medicine in Hawai‘i (Part 1).” Hawai‘i Journal of Medicine & Public Health 75, no. 3 (2016): 87-89.
 Kerri A. Inglis and Helen Wong Smith. “University of Hawaii, Hilo: UH-Hilo & the Christensen Photographic Collection: Preserving a Piece of Hamākua's History.” Past or Portal? Enhancing Undergraduate Education through Special Collections and Archives. Edited by Eleanor Mitchell, Peggy Seiden and Suzy Taraba. Chicago: Association of College and Research Libraries, 2012.
 A Brief History of the Ahupua`a of Pu`uwa`awa`a and its Neighbors in North Kona, Island of Hawaiʻi.
Collaboration with Marion Kelly, for Earl Bakken, Kīholo, Hawaiʻi, 1996.

Awards 
 President's Award for Excellence, Council of State Archivists, 2022
 Awardee, Lei Lau Kukui Award, Society of American Archivists Student Chapter, Hawai`i, 2018
 Awardee, Archives Leadership Institute, Berea College, Kentucky, 2016
 Fellow, Society of American Archivists, 2016
 Agnes C. Conrad Award, Association of Hawai‘i Archivists, 2009
 Awardee, Mary Edward Professional Award - Library Alumnus, 1990
 Awardee, Beta Phi Mu (Library Honor Society) Chapter XI, 1986

References 

Year of birth missing (living people)
Living people
American archivists
American librarians
American librarians of Chinese descent
American women librarians
American women academics
Fellows of the Society of American Archivists
Female archivists
University of Hawaiʻi alumni
University of Hawaiʻi at Mānoa faculty
21st-century American women